Amauropsis brassiculina is a species of predatory sea snail, a marine gastropod mollusk in the family Naticidae, the moon snails.

References

 Gofas, S.; Le Renard, J.; Bouchet, P. (2001). Mollusca. in: Costello, M.J. et al. (eds), European Register of Marine Species: a check-list of the marine species in Europe and a bibliography of guides to their identification. Patrimoines Naturels. 50: 180–213.
 Bouchet P. & Warén A. (1993). Revision of the Northeast Atlantic bathyal and abyssal Mesogastropoda. Bollettino Malacologico supplemento 3: 579-840

External links
 Locard A. (1897-1898). Expéditions scientifiques du Travailleur et du Talisman pendant les années 1880, 1881, 1882 et 1883. Mollusques testacés. Paris, Masson. vol. 1 [1897, p. 1-516 pl. 1-22; vol. 2 [1898], p. 1–515, pl. 1-18]

Naticidae
Gastropods described in 1897